Buya may be,

Buya people, an ethnic group of South Sudan
Buya language (disambiguation)
Madam Buya, a Homo erectus fossil found in Eritrea and Ethiopia
Buyid dynasty or Buyahids (934–1062), a Shia Iranian dynasty founded by the sons of a fisherman named Buya

The Empire of Buya, a fictional kingdom in Nexus: The Kingdom of the Winds